Maina Tudu (ᱢᱟᱭᱱᱚ ᱴᱩᱰᱩ) is an Indian writer of Santali language and housewife from Odisha. She won Yuva Puraskar  in 2017.

Biography
Tudu is a graduate in Santali. For her poetry Marsal Dahar she was awarded  Yuva Puraskar  in 2017.

Tudu also wrote Ol Chiki Ada Gaban.

References

Santali writers
Living people
1980s births
Housewives
Santali people
Adivasi women
Recipients of the Sahitya Akademi Yuva Puraskar